Artikulo 247 is a 2022 Philippine television drama legal crime series broadcast by GMA Network. Directed by Jorron Lee Monroy, it stars Rhian Ramos and Kris Bernal. It premiered on March 7, 2022 on the network's Afternoon Prime line up. The series concluded on June 3, 2022 with a total of 63 episodes. It was replaced by The Fake Life in its timeslot.

Premise
The show features a frustrated homicide victim, with her assailant getting away due to Article 247 of Revised Penal Code. She will later encounter her attacker again, leading her to fight for justice.

Cast and characters
Lead cast
 Rhian Ramos as Mary Jane "MJ" Ortega-Borromeo
 Kris Bernal as Klaire  Almazan-Gomez / Carmen Villarama-Borromeo

Supporting cast
 Benjamin Alves as Noah Borromeo
 Mark Herras as Elijah Borromeo
 Mike Tan as Julian Pineda
 Glydel Mercado as Rose Ortega
 Victor Silayan as Alfred Gomez
 Carla Martinez as Sarah Borromeo
 Maureen Larrazabal as Pinky
 Denise Barbacena as Chi-Chi

Episodes
<onlyinclude>
<onlyinclude>

Production
In June 2021, Benjamin Alves replaced Rocco Nacino in the series. Nacino was initially cast, and later left to appear in the Philippine drama series To Have & to Hold. Actress Jackie Rice was also initially included in the cast. Rice was later replaced by Kris Bernal. Principal photography commenced in October 2021.

References

External links
 
 

2022 Philippine television series debuts
2022 Philippine television series endings
Filipino-language television shows
GMA Network drama series
Murder in television
Philippine crime television series
Philippine legal television series
Television shows set in the Philippines